King Sterndale is a village and civil parish in Derbyshire, England. It is located in the Peak District, 4 miles east of Buxton. It has a population of about 30, increasing to 133 at the 2011 Census.  The two hamlets of Cowdale and Staden also lie within the parish.

History
The village has a butter cross which was restored in 1937. Unusually, vehicular access to the village is only available from one direction, via a road/piece of land that is twenty metres wide. This land was created as a result of an Enclosure in 1773. The route of the road changed slightly as a result of the church's construction in 1847.

The village is the Derbyshire seat of the Pickford family, founders of the moving company Pickfords.

Deep Dale is a steep gorge to the south east of King Sterndale. It has a protected nature reserve and is a Site of Special Scientific Interest (SSSI). In the late 19th century a bear's skull and many Roman artefacts were discovered in Thirst House Cave in Deep Dale.

Topley Pike Quarry is a large limestone quarry 200m east of the village. It was opened in 1907 by Messrs. Newton Chambers & Co. and is currently operated by Tarmac Roadstone Holdings Ltd.

See also
Listed buildings in King Sterndale

References

Villages in Derbyshire
Towns and villages of the Peak District
High Peak, Derbyshire